Montenotte may refer to:

Italy
 Cairo Montenotte
 Montenotte Department

Ireland
 Montenotte, Cork
 The Montenotte Hotel